A Lion was a Scottish gold coin ordered to be struck in 1451 which featured a lion on one side and a depiction of St. Andrew on the other. The coin weighted the same as half an English Noble and was worth six shillings and eight pence.

References

Bibliography

Coins of Scotland
Lions in art
Andrew the Apostle